This article is about the small islands of Korea.

Incheon

Ganghwa
 Boreumdo
 Achado
 Bido
 Maldo
 Suribong
 Yongrando
 Donggeomdo
 Ganghwado
 Eoyujeongdo
 Gogado
 Maeumdo
 Songgado
 Gyodongdo
 Jumundo
 Bunjido
 Seokdo
 Suseom
 Susido
 Seogeomdo
 Goiriseom
 Mibeopdo
 Nabdo
 Seongmodo
 Ddannapseom
 Daeseom
 Daesongdo
 Dolseom
 Gijangseom
 Sosongdo
 Woodo

Ongjin
 Baegado
 Beolseom
 Budo
 Doryangdo
 Gyeseom
 Gwando
 Gwangdaedo
 Jido
 Meongaeseom
 Nabdo
 Oseom
 Uldo
 Baengnyeongdo
 Daecheongdo
 Daechojido
 Daeijakdo
 Deokjeokdo
 Meokdo
 Dongbaekdo
 Eopyungdo
 Gabjukdo
 Gado
 Gakheuldo
 Anggakheuldo
 Tonggakheuldo
 Jungtonggakheuldo
 Sotonggakheuldo
 Gureopdo
 Hangdo
 Jangbongdo
 Amseodo
 Bigajido
 Dongmando
 Sado
 Seomando
 Seonmido
 Wado
 Jawoldo
 Modo
 Mungapdo
 Mungtungdo
 Odo
 Saseungbongdo
 Seongapdo
 Seonjaedo
 Cheukdo
 Oihangdo
 Seungbongdo
 Gumdo
 Budo
 Sanggonggyungdo
 Sido
 Sindo
 Socheongdo
 Sochojido
 Sogado
 Soijakdo
 Yeongheungdo
 Yeonpyeongdo
 Daeyeonpyeongdo
 Soyeonpyeongdo
 Chaekdo
 Moido
 Kujido
 Geodo
 Soyado

Other
 Jakyakdo
 Muuido
 Palmido
 Silmido
 Se-eodo
 Songdo (Artificial island)
 Yongyudo, Yeongjongdo—now joined together by Incheon International Airport

Gyeonggi

Ansan
 Bultando
 Daebudo
 Pungdo
 Seongamdo
 Yukdo

Hwaseong
 Eodo
 Gukhwado
 Hyungdo
 Jebudo
 Ueumdo

South Chungcheong

Dangjin
 Daejodo
 Haengdando
 Nanjido

Seosan
 Bunjeomdo
 Ganwoldo
 Gopado
 Jeodo
 Ungdo
 Woodo
 docdo

Taean
 Ando
 Anmyeondo
 Dujido
 Gauido
 Gyeokryeolbi Islands
 Bukgyeokryeolbido
 Donggyeokryeolbido
 Seogyeokryeolbido
 Hwangdo
 Jukdo
 Mado
 Napasudo
 Oedo
 Oepasudo
 Ongdo
 Sinjindo

Hongseong
 Jukdo

Boryeong
 Bingdo
 Chudo
 Godaedo
 Heoyukdo
 Hodo
 Hyojado
 Janggodo
 Jukdo
 Nokdo
 Oeyeongdo
 Sapsido
 Sodo
 Songdo
 Wonsando
 Woldo
 Yukdo

Seocheo
 Yubudo

North Jeolla

South Jeolla
 Anma-do
 Choramdo
 Chuja Gundo
 Gageodo
 Hauido
 Heuksando
 Hongdo
 Hwa-do
 Imjado
 Jindo
 Naenarodo
 Nohwado
 Odongdo
 Oenarodo
 Port Hamilton (Geomundo)
Sodo (Seodo)
Sunhodo (Dongdo)
 Saengildo
 Sangtedo
 Sinjido
 Yeoseo-do
 Wan-do

Jeju
 Jeju-do
 Gapado
 Marado
 Udo

South Gyeongsang

Within Hadong-gun 
 Mado
 Daedo
 Jangdo
 Jujiseom

Within Namhae-gun 
 Namhaedo
 Changseondo
 Jodo
 Hodo
 Nodo
 Sochido
 Maando

Within Sacheon-si 
 Woldeungdo
 Sinsudo

Within Goseong-gun 
 Anjangseom
 Jarando
 Wado
 Witdaehoseom
 Patseom

Within Tongyeong-si 
 Suudo
 Saryangdo
 Araetseom
 Dumido
 Hanodaedo
 Yokjido
 Chudo
 Bongdo
 Udo
 Yeonhwado
 Jwasarido
 Sojanggundo
 Mireukdo
 Yeondaedo
 Naebujido
 Oebujido
 Hakrimdo
 Ogokdo
 Gukdo
 Jido
 Hwado
 Jukdo
 Hansando
 Bijindo
 Sojido
 Bisando
 Eoeuido
 Sudo
 Jwado
 Yongchodo
 Songdo
 Chubongdo
 Jukdo
 Jangsado
 Daedeokdo
 Gawangdo
 Maemuldo
 Somaemuldo

Busan

Yeongdo
Jodo

North Gyeongsang
 Ulleungdo
 Jukdo
 Kwanundo
 Dokdo (Liancourt Rocks) - disputed by Japan

Seoul
 Seonyudo
 Yeouido
 Bamseom
 Nodeulseom

Number of islands by administrative divisions

List of islands by area

See also
List of islands
Geography of North Korea
Geography of South Korea
List of islands of North Korea

References

 
Korea
Islands